Laura is a post-rock band from Melbourne, Australia.

History
Laura formed in 2001 and released their debut EP - Photographs... in 2002. Although it received positive reviews on the whole, it failed to gain the band a significant following. However, with their follow up album Mapping Your Dreams (produced by noted Japanese engineer Naomune Anzai) in 2004, they became world-renowned for their loud live shows and post-rock sound.

The album garnered high-rotation airplay and promotional support from independent radio stations FBi Radio and 2ser in Sydney as well as 3RRR and 3PBS in Melbourne. It was critically successful notably in the naming of self-released single We Should Keep This Secret (from their Mapping Your Dreams album) as Beat Magazine's single of the week in 4 September, and later becoming the magazine's single of that year.

Radio Swan Is Down, their second album, was released in 2006 and was supported by a national tour.  

In February 2007, Laura supported US band Isis on their tour of Australia.  (re)capitulate, released in October 2007, is a live recording that was recorded at the HiFi Bar in Melbourne during this tour. The live version of 'Radio Swan Is Down part 1' was voted Beat Single of the week as well as receiving much critical acclaim for its intensity and power.

Their second EP Yes Maybe No, released in 2008 on US label Elevation Recordings, was limited to 2000 copies.

Having released a Japanese edition of Radio Swan is Down the previous year, Laura toured Japan in 2008 to promote the album, playing shows in Tokyo, Osaka and Hiroshima. In 2009, they supported Swedish band Cult of Luna and Japanese band Mono on their tours of Australia.

The band play live shows occasionally and continue to write new material. 

In 2018, Andrew, Ben and Carolyn starting writing and recording some new material for their side project, Sens Dep (Sensory Deprivation). Their album Lush Desolation is being released on the 30th November 2020.

Members
Nathan Biggin (piano, synthesizers, guitars)
Andrew Chalmers (guitars, vocals)
Carolyn Gannell (cello)
Andrew Yardley (bass guitars)
Ben Yardley (guitars)

Discography

Singles
We Should Keep This Secret (2004)
I Hope (2006)
Radio Swan Is Down part 1 - Live (2007)
Mark the Day (2010)
This Grey Earth (2011)
The Slow (2012)

EPs
Photographs... (2002)
Yes Maybe No (2008)

Albums
Mapping Your Dreams (2005)
Radio Swan Is Down (2006)
Live Album - (re)capitulate (2007)
Twelve Hundred Times (2011)

External links
Band Website

Victoria (Australia) musical groups
Australian post-rock groups